Czarnów may refer to the following places in Poland:
Czarnów, Lower Silesian Voivodeship (south-west Poland)
Czarnów, Łódź Voivodeship (central Poland)
Czarnów, Piaseczno County in Masovian Voivodeship (east-central Poland)
Czarnów, Warsaw West County in Masovian Voivodeship (east-central Poland)
Czarnów, Wołomin County in Masovian Voivodeship (east-central Poland)
Czarnów, Lubusz Voivodeship (west Poland)